Felicity Philippa, Lady Scott ( Talbot-Ponsonby; 22 November 1918 – 5 January 2010) was a British wildlife conservationist.

Personal life
Born in Bloemfontein, South Africa, Scott later moved to England, and worked in the code school at Bletchley Park during World War II. She married Sir Peter Scott, naturalist and founder of the Wildfowl and Wetlands Trust (WWT), in Reykjavík, Iceland, in 1951 after an expedition to ring pink-footed geese. She died, aged 91, in Slimbridge, Gloucestershire.

Career
Scott was Honorary Director of the Wildfowl and Wetlands Trust, founded in 1948 by Sir Peter. She had a keen interest in nature and the environment and wrote numerous books about her travels from the Arctic to the Antarctic.

Scott was also professional wildlife photographer, President of the Nature in Art Trust, scuba diver  and an associate of the Royal Photographic Society.

Publications 
 The Art of Peter Scott (completely revised in 2008)
 Lucky Me (autobiographical)
 So Many Sunlit Hours (autobiographical)

Legacy
Scotts' wrasse, Cirrhilabrus scottorum was named after Scott and her husband for their “great contribution in nature conservation".

Quotes 
 "The Scott partnership put conservation on the map, at a time when conservation was not a word that most people understood." - Sir David Attenborough

Portrait of Philippa Scott
Scott agreed to sit for a portrait head in clay by Jon Edgar at her home in Slimbridge in February 2007 as part of the sculptor's environmental series of heads. A bronze was unveiled at the Slimbridge Wildfowl and Wetlands Trust visitor centre on 6 December 2011.

References

External links 
 "Philippa Scott obituary" The Guardian obituary (10 January 2010).
 Stroud News obituary The Stroud News and Journal obituary (16 January 2010)
 Oral history/interviews dating from Slimbridge 2005

1918 births
2010 deaths
British conservationists
English women photographers
British writers
People from Bloemfontein
People from Stroud District
Philippa
South African emigrants to the United Kingdom
Wives of knights